Arctic Bay Airport  is an airport located  southeast of Arctic Bay, Nunavut, Canada. On January 13, 2010, First Air transferred all air services to Arctic Bay's newly expanded airport with service to Iqaluit and Resolute Bay. Niore Iqalukjuak, mayor of Arctic Bay, said that the move would save community members $40 for the one way taxi ride. At the same time the Government of Nunavut said that the move would save $600,000 a year because of not having to keep the all-weather road clear.

It was decommissioned in 2010 and is now marked off with two "X"s on either ends. The airport can currently handle general aviation to smaller turboprop aircraft.

Airlines and destinations

References

External links
 
 Page about this aerodrome on COPA's Places to Fly airport directory

Airports in the Arctic
Baffin Island
Certified airports in the Qikiqtaaluk Region